Dorstenia roigii is a plant species in the family Moraceae which is native to Cuba.

References

roigii
Plants described in 1924
Flora of Cuba
Flora without expected TNC conservation status